Le Pontet is the name of the following communes in France:

 Le Pontet, Savoie, in the Savoie department
 Le Pontet, Vaucluse, in the Vaucluse department